Taneekarn Dangda (Thai: ธนีกาญจน์ แดงดา; born 15 December 1992) is a Thai international women's association footballer playing as a forward who plays for MH Nakhon Si Lady.

Personal life 
Taneekarn was born in Bangkok but her parents are from Surin province of Northeastern Thailand. Her brother, Teerasil Dangda, is a member of the Thailand national football team and also plays as a striker; their father was also a footballer and played for Royal Thai Air Force FC.

Career statistics

International

International goals

Honours

International
Thailand 
 AFC Women's Championship Fifth Place: 2014
 AFF Women's Championship: 2011, 2015
 Southeast Asian Games Gold Medal: 2013

References

External links

 
 
Profile  at Östersunds

1992 births
Living people
Taneekarn Dangda
Taneekarn Dangda
Women's association football forwards
Expatriate women's footballers in Sweden
2015 FIFA Women's World Cup players
Taneekarn Dangda
Taneekarn Dangda
Taneekarn Dangda
Southeast Asian Games medalists in football
Footballers at the 2018 Asian Games
Competitors at the 2013 Southeast Asian Games
Competitors at the 2017 Southeast Asian Games
2019 FIFA Women's World Cup players
Taneekarn Dangda
Competitors at the 2019 Southeast Asian Games
Taneekarn Dangda